Moradi (also Romanized as Morādī) is a village in Dulab Rural District, Shahab District, Qeshm County, Hormozgan Province, Iran. At the 2006 census, its population was 283, in 68 families.

References 

Populated places in Qeshm County